Jason Douglas Crabb (born March 3, 1977) is a Christian music singer and musician. He has been the lead vocalist for the group The Crabb Family.

Crabb was voted "Favorite Male Vocalist" at the inaugural Harmony Honors Awards and "Favorite Young Artist" at the 2000 Singing News Fan Awards. In 2004, he was voted 2004 Gospel Music Male Vocalist of the Year. He has been nominated for many other awards during his career. He has worked extensively with the Brooklyn Tabernacle Choir as a soloist.

Career
The Crabb Family retired as a group in 2007 to go their separate ways.

As a solo artist, he was signed to Spring Hill Music Group. His self-titled debut solo album was released on June 30, 2009. It reached No. 62 on the Billboard 200, No. 2 on the Billboard Christian albums chart, and No. 1 on Nielsen SoundScan's Southern Gospel albums chart. The album won a 2010 Grammy award for Best Southern/Country/Bluegrass Gospel Album. It won a 2010 Grammy Award. The album was also nominated for a Dove Award for Country Album of the Year at the 41st GMA Dove Awards. On September 28, 2010, Spring Hill Music Group released Jason's second solo project, a Christmas album titled Because It's Christmas. In 2011, the family group reunited to record a new album, along with a concert tour from the end of 2011 through the beginning of 2012.

In October 2012, Crabb appeared on Marie Osmond's Hallmark Channel show, Marie. In November, he was featured on Fox News Channel with anchor Kelly Wright for a special segment called "Beyond The Dream". During the Christmas 2012 season, Jason teamed up with Sandi Patty for A Christmas Celebration Tour. One of the concerts was held in New York to benefit Hurricane Sandy victims.

Crabb's next project, Love is Stronger, was released on March 12, 2013. It was produced by Jay DeMarcus (Rascal Flatts), Ed Cash and Wayne Haun. The album features a special guest appearance by Kari Jobe.

Crabb is signed to Provident Label Group, a division of Sony Music Entertainment. His first studio album, Whatever the Road, with Reunion Records, was released September 18, 2015.

Personal life
Jason and his wife, Shellye, have two daughters.

Discography

Compilations
2015: Through the Fire: The Best of Jason Crabb

Appearances on other albums
2000: Testament, Talley Trio; "Searchin'"
2003: Roads That I've Traveled, Gerald Crabb; "Through the Fire"
2004: Hymns from My Heart, Delores Winans; "Oh, I Want to See Him"
2005: I'm Amazed...Live, Brooklyn Tabernacle Choir; "I'm Amazed"
2005: Torch: A Live Celebration of Southern Gospel's Next Generation, various artists; "Midnight Cry"
2006: Bless the Broken Road: The Duets Album, Selah; "Ain't No Grave"
2006: Look at Me Now, Wess Morgan; "He Stepped In"
2006: Remembering The Greats, various artists; "The Lighthouse"
2009: Glory Revealed II, Dixie Melody Boys; "God Will Hear Your Prayer"
2010: Better Day, Gaither Vocal Band; "Somebody Like Me", "Daystar (Shine Down on Me)"
2011: The Call Is Still The Same, Gaither Vocal Band; "Somebody Like Me", "Daystar (Shine Down on Me)"
2012: Working on a Building, various artists; "On The Other Side", "All Hail The Power"
2013: Like Father, Like Son, James and Jeff Easter; "I've Got No Rocks to Throw" with father Gerald Crabb
2014: Ready to Fly, Jamie Grace; "Fighter (Acoustic)"
2014: Kirk Cameron's Saving Christmas [Soundtrack]; "Let Us Adore"
2015: Forever Changed, T. Graham Brown; "Soul Talk", "People Get Ready"
2015: Help 2.0, Erica Campbell; "I'm a Fan"

Video

2011: The Song Lives On Live

Gaither Homecoming video solo performances
2001: What A Time!; "Please Forgive Me" (Crabb Family)
2001: Journey to the Sky; "Because I Love Him"
2002: New Orleans Homecoming; "Through the Fire" (Crabb Family)
2004: We Will Stand; "Until I Found the Lord"
2007: How Great Thou Art; "I'd Rather Have Jesus" (Crabb Family)
2008: Country Bluegrass Homecoming Vol. 1; "I Sure Miss You"
2008: Rock of Ages; "The Blood Will Never Lose Its Power"
2010: Count Your Blessings; "Ellsworth", "Please Forgive Me"
2011: Tent Revival Homecoming; "Take My Hand, Precious Lord"
2011: Old Rugged Cross; "Sometimes I Cry"

Filmography

Awards and nominations
Crabb has received several awards and nominations, both as part of a group and as a solo artist.

GMA Dove Awards

Grammy Awards

References

External links
 

 Jason Crabb's blog
 Jason Crabb at Spring Hill Music
 " Jason Crabb Among 2010 'Artists To Watch'", breathecast.com

20th-century American singers
21st-century American singers
1977 births
American gospel singers
American performers of Christian music
Christians from Kentucky
Living people
People from Beaver Dam, Kentucky
Singers from Kentucky
Southern gospel performers